Elvis Toci (born 1961) is an Albanian sport manager and president of the Albanian Ski Federation.

Elvis Toci is also honorary consul of Romania.

Biography
In addition to being a 15-year ski enthusiast, Toci brings to the table the experience of a career as an Associated Press reporter, businessman, developer and real estate investor. He is a graduate of the University of Bucharest and holds a postgraduate degree from Lancashire University. Toci is married and has two children.

Career
Elvis Toci began to have some international notoriety at the beginning of the 2022–23 FIS Alpine Ski World Cup when he was present in some races of the White Circus (Ski World Cup), to follow the 16-year-old Italian naturalized Albanian Lara Colturi, a young promise of alpine skiing.

References

External links
 
 Albanian Ski Federation at YouTube

1961 births
Living people
Albanian sports executives and administrators